Murdock Island is an island in the Great Barrier Reef Marine Park situated about 90 km south-east of Cape Melville and about 300 km south-east of Coen Queensland.

Islands on the Great Barrier Reef
Uninhabited islands of Australia
Islands of Far North Queensland
Great Barrier Reef Marine Park